Haimar Zubeldia Agirre (born 1 April 1977) is a Spanish former road racing cyclist from the Basque Country, who competed professionally between 1998 and 2017 for the , ,  and  teams. During his career, Zubeldia recorded five top-ten finishes in the Tour de France, and one in the Vuelta a España.

Biography
Born and raised in Usurbil, Gipuzkoa, Zubeldia currently resides in the neighboring village of Zarautz. His younger brother Joseba Zubeldia also competed as a professional racing cyclist.

In 2000, he won the Euskal Bizikleta, and finished second overall in the Critérium du Dauphiné Libéré. After his win in 2000 in the Euskal Bizikleta, it took him ten years to win again, when he won the Tour de l'Ain.

In his career, Zubeldia started 29 Grand Tours – 16 at the Tour de France, 12 at the Vuelta a España and 1 at the Giro d'Italia – finishing 26.

Major results

Sources:

1998
 10th Overall Tour de l'Avenir
1999
 6th Prueba Villafranca de Ordizia
 9th Overall Vuelta a Burgos
 10th Overall Volta a Catalunya
2000
 1st  Overall Euskal Bizikleta
1st Stage 4
 2nd Overall Critérium du Dauphiné Libéré
1st  Young rider classification
 4th Overall Vuelta a La Rioja
 9th Paris–Camembert
 10th Overall Vuelta a Aragón
 10th Overall Vuelta a Asturias
 10th Overall Vuelta a España
2001
 7th Overall Volta a Catalunya
2002
 4th Overall Critérium du Dauphiné Libéré
1st  Young rider classification
 9th Paris–Camembert
2003
 3rd Overall Vuelta a Murcia
 3rd Subida a Urkiola
 4th Overall Euskal Bizikleta
 5th Overall Tour de France
 10th LuK Challenge Chrono
2004
 3rd Overall Vuelta a Asturias
 5th Overall Euskal Bizikleta
 7th Overall Clásica Internacional de Alcobendas
2005
 7th Clásica de San Sebastián
2006
 8th Overall Tour de France
 8th Overall Euskal Bizikleta
 10th Overall Vuelta a Castilla y León
2007
 4th Overall Tour de France
 8th Overall GP Internacional Paredes Rota dos Móveis
 8th Gran Premio de Llodio
2008
 5th Overall Critérium du Dauphiné Libéré
 6th Overall Volta a Catalunya
 9th Clásica de San Sebastián
 10th Overall Vuelta a Mallorca
9th Trofeo Sóller
2009
 1st Stage 4 (TTT) Tour de France
 3rd Overall Volta a Catalunya
 8th Overall Critérium du Dauphiné Libéré
2010
 1st  Overall Tour de l'Ain
1st Prologue
 4th Overall Tour du Poitou-Charentes
 4th Clásica de San Sebastián
 4th Grand Prix Cycliste de Montréal
2011
 7th Clásica de San Sebastián
 8th Overall Vuelta a Andalucía
2012
 6th Overall Tour de France
 8th Overall Vuelta a Andalucía
 10th Overall Critérium du Dauphiné
 10th Overall Bayern Rundfahrt
2014
 7th Clásica de San Sebastián
 8th Overall Tour de France
2015
 6th Overall Tour of California
2017
 10th Overall Tour of California

Grand Tour general classification results timeline

References

External links

RadioShack-Leopard: Haimar Zubeldia

Cycling Base: Haimar Zubeldia 

1977 births
Living people
Spanish male cyclists
Cyclists from the Basque Country (autonomous community)
People from Usurbil
Sportspeople from Gipuzkoa